This article shows the rosters of all participating teams at the women's volleyball tournament at the 2008 Summer Olympics in Beijing.

Group A

The following is the Chinese roster in the women's volleyball tournament of the 2008 Summer Olympics.

The following is the Cuban roster in the women's volleyball tournament of the 2008 Summer Olympics.

The following is the Japanese roster in the women's volleyball tournament of the 2008 Summer Olympics.

The following is the Polish roster in the women's volleyball tournament of the 2008 Summer Olympics.

The following is the American roster in the women's volleyball tournament of the 2008 Summer Olympics.

The following is the Venezuelan roster in the women's volleyball tournament of the 2008 Summer Olympics.

Group B

The following is the Algerian roster in the women's volleyball tournament of the 2008 Summer Olympics.

The following is the Brazilian roster in the women's volleyball tournament of the 2008 Summer Olympics.

The following is the Italian roster in the women's volleyball tournament of the 2008 Summer Olympics.

The following is the Kazakh roster in the women's volleyball tournament of the 2008 Summer Olympics.

The following is the Russian roster in the women's volleyball tournament of the 2008 Summer Olympics.

The following is the Serbian roster in the women's volleyball tournament of the 2008 Summer Olympics.

See also
Volleyball at the 2008 Summer Olympics – Men's team rosters

References

External links
Official website of the 2008 women's Olympic volleyball tournament

2008
2
Women's team rosters
2008 in women's volleyball
Vol